Alan Robert Wassell (born 15 April 1940) is a former English first-class cricketer. Wassell was a left-handed batsman who bowled slow left-arm orthodox spin.

Wassell made his first-class debut for Hampshire in 1957 against Cambridge University. Wassell represented Hampshire in 121 first-class matches from 1957 to 1966, with his final first-class appearance for the county coming against the touring West Indians in 1966. Wassell also played one-day cricket for Hampshire, with his one-day debut coming in the 1963 Gillette Cup against Derbyshire in what was Hampshire's first one-day match. From 1963 to 1966, Wassell played 4 one day matches for Hampshire, with his final one-day game coming against Lincolnshire in the 1966 Gillette Cup.

In his 121 first-class matches for the county, Wassell scored 1,209 runs at a batting average of 8.95, with a single half century score of 61 against Lancashire in 1962. Wassell was employed as a bowler, taking 317 wickets at a bowling average of 27.05, with 11 five wicket hauls and a single ten wicket haul in a match. Wassell's best bowling figures of 7/87 came against Surrey in 1961. In addition Wassell took 96 catches in the field for Hampshire.

In Wassell's 32 one-day matches for the county he took 8 wickets at an average of 27.37, with best figures of 3/70 against Derbyshire in 1963.

In addition to playing first-class matches for Hampshire, Wassell also represented the Marylebone Cricket Club in a single first-class match in 1959 against Oxford University, taking 3 wickets.

External links
Alan Wassell at Cricinfo
Alan Wassell at CricketArchive
Matches and detailed statistics for Alan Wassell

1940 births
Living people
People from Fareham
English cricketers
Hampshire cricketers
Marylebone Cricket Club cricketers